Honor Bound may refer to:
 Honor Bound (1920 film), an American drama film directed by Jacques Jaccard
 Honor Bound (1928 film), an American drama film directed by Alfred E. Green, Jean Harlow's first role
 Honor Bound (1988 film), a film directed by Jeannot Szwarc
 "Honor Bound" (song), a 1985 song written by Tommy Rocco, Charlie Black, and Austin Roberts and recorded by Earl Thomas Conley
 Honor Bound series, a 1993 series of World War II thriller novels written by W.E.B. Griffin
 Honor Bound: Inside the Guantanamo Trials, a 2008 book about the Guantanamo Military Commissions by Kyndra Rotunda
 Honor Bound to Defend Freedom, motto of the Joint Task Force Guantanamo